"Gold" is a song by American rock band Imagine Dragons, which bases itself on the story of the Midas Touch. The track was released as the second single from their second studio album Smoke + Mirrors on December 16, 2014. The track was written by band members Ben McKee, Daniel Platzman, Dan Reynolds and Wayne Sermon, as well as the producer of the song, Alex da Kid. The music video was released onto Vevo on January 21, 2015. The song was used by FX to promote their FX Now app, and by Discovery Channel to promote their show Gold Rush's season 6 premiere. The Jorgen Odegard remix of the song was featured on the soundtrack of the video game, NBA 2K17.

Composition and production
According to the sheet music published at musicnotes.com, the song is written in the key of A minor, with a moderate tempo.

Lyrics
Along with "Hopeless Opus" and "I'm So Sorry" on Smoke + Mirrors, the song touches upon lead-singer Dan Reynolds' depression struggles.

Recording
Dan Reynolds told Billboard that "Gold" was one of the last songs to be recorded for Smoke + Mirrors: "I came home from tour with my head spinning and decided to run away for a bit to the west coast and reflect/write about the last couple years." He also commented on how listening and performing the song takes him back to the moment of writing the song on the beach.

Track listing

Charts

Weekly charts

Year-end charts

Certifications

References

2014 songs
Songs about loneliness
Imagine Dragons songs
Kidinakorner singles
Interscope Records singles
Songs written by Alex da Kid
Song recordings produced by Alex da Kid
Songs written by Wayne Sermon
Songs written by Dan Reynolds (musician)
Songs written by Daniel Platzman
Songs written by Ben McKee